McPherson County is the name of three counties in the United States:

 McPherson County, Kansas 
 McPherson County, Nebraska 
 McPherson County, South Dakota